Brudzewo  is a village in the administrative district of Gmina Strzałkowo, within Słupca County, Greater Poland Voivodeship, in west-central Poland.

Notable people
Albert Brudzewski (c.1445–c.1497), astronomer, mathematician, philosopher and diplomat

References

Brudzewo